The 1995 Russian Second League was the fourth edition of the Russian Second Division. It was the first season when 3 points were awarded for a win. There were 3 zones with 62 teams starting the competition (1 was excluded before the end of the season).

Zone West

Overview

Standings

Top goalscorers 
30 goals

 Aleksei Gerasimenko (FC Kuban Krasnodar)

24 goals

  Ibragim Gasanbekov (FC Anzhi Makhachkala)

23 goals

 Valeri Solyanik (FC CSK VVS-Kristall Smolensk)

22 goals

 Oleg Kirimov (PFC Spartak Nalchik)

21 goals

 Stanislav Lysenko (FC Kuban Krasnodar)

20 goals

 Soslan Gazanov (FC Iriston Vladikavkaz)

19 goals

 Valeri Popov (FC Torpedo Taganrog)

17 goals

 Aslan Goplachev (PFC Spartak Nalchik)
  Varlam Kilasonia (FC Lokomotiv St. Petersburg)

16 goals
Maksim Balayev (FC Kavkazkabel Prokhladny)
Igor Danilov (FC Lokomotiv St. Petersburg)
Gennady Korkin (FC Metallurg Lipetsk)
Vladimir Polikarpov (FC Spartak Shchyolkovo)
Vitali Yermilov (FC Torpedo Taganrog)

Zone Centre

Overview

Standings

Top goalscorers 

29 goals

 Aleksandr Zaikin (FC Lada Dimitrovgrad)

20 goals

 Aleksei Chernov (FC Zvezda Gorodishche)
  Taras Trizna (FC Nosta Novotroitsk)

18 goals

 Aleksei Bobrov (FC Lada Dimitrovgrad)
 Nikolai Sukhov (FC Tekstilshchik Ivanovo)
 Sergei Yuminov (FC Gazovik-Gazprom Izhevsk)

16 goals

 Sergei Budarin (FC Nosta Novotroitsk)
 Igor Pimenov (FC Industriya Obninsk)

15 goals

 Aleksandr Zernov (FC Tekstilshchik Ivanovo)

14 goals

 Sergei Chesnakas (FC Lada Dimitrovgrad)
 Andrei Glukhikh (FC Gazovik-Gazprom Izhevsk)
 Andrei Knyazev (FC Metallurg Magnitogorsk)
 Aleksandr Sevidov (FC UralAZ Miass)

Zone East

Overview

Standings

Top goalscorers 

21 goals

 Sergei Chernov (FC Metallurg-ZapSib Novokuznetsk)

20 goals

 Stanislav Chaplygin (FC Metallurg-ZapSib Novokuznetsk)

19 goals

 Vadim Belokhonov (FC Metallurg Krasnoyarsk)

17 goals

 Anatoli Kisurin (FC Dynamo Omsk)
 Yevgeni Zarva (FC Irtysh Tobolsk)

16 goals

 Viktor Kashko (FC Dynamo Yakutsk)
 Andrei Korovin (FC Amur Blagoveshchensk)

15 goals

 Vyacheslav Koloda (FC Dynamo Barnaul)

14 goals

 Sergei Ageyev (FC Viktoriya Nazarovo)

13 goals

 Ruslan Akhidzhak (FC Tom Tomsk)

See also
1995 Russian Top League
1995 Russian First League
1995 Russian Third League

3
1995
Russia
Russia